Philip Dietrich (also known as Philip Theodore) (2 November 1614 in Arolsen – 7 December 1645 in Korbach), was the ruling Count of Waldeck-Eisenberg from 1640 until his death.

Family 
He was the son of Count Wolrad IV of Waldeck-Eisenberg and his wife Anna of Baden-Durlach, heir to the Lordship of Cuylenburg in today's Netherlands.  In 1639 in Culemborg, he married Countess Maria Magdalena of Nassau-Siegen.  With her, he had several children, including his successor Henry Wolrad.  Another son, Florent William died as a child. His daughter Countess Amalia Katharina of Waldeck-Eisenberg married George Louis I, Count of Erbach-Erbach.

Life 
From the inheritance claims of his mother's, Philip Dietrich received the Lordships of Kinsweiler, Engelsdorf, Frechen and Bachem in the Eifel area.  He made several journeys to France and served in the Dutch army for a long time.

In 1639, Count Floris of Pallandt died, the holder of the Lordships of Cuylenburg, Werth, Pallandt and Wittem.  Philip Dietrich inherited these possessions via his mother.  In 1640, he inherited Waldeck-Eisenberg.  He alternated his residence between Eisenberg Castle and Culemborg.  He fought a protracted legal battle about his mother's claims in the Eiffel.  In the end, he did not receive them, but had to accept a monetary compensation.

References 
 Johann Friedrich Schannat: Eiflia illustrata oder geographische und historische Beschreibung der Eifel', 'vol. 1, part 2, Aachen, 1825, p. 807 ff
 Louis Friedrich Christian Curtze: Geschichte und Beschreibung des Fürstenthums Waldeck. Arolsen, 1850, p. 649
 Historisch-kritischer Kommentar zu Yarks Eisenberg, in: Waldeckische Gemeinnützige Zeitschrift'', vol. 1, 1837, p. 389

External links 
Funeral sermon for Philip Dietrich by Antonius Hagenbusch
About coins from Waldeck

Footnotes

House of Waldeck
Counts of Waldeck
1614 births
1645 deaths
17th-century German people